The Mechanized Brigade "Legnano" was a mechanized brigade of the Italian Army. Its core units were mechanized infantry battalions. The brigade's headquarters was in the city of Bergamo in Lombardy. The name of the brigade commemorates the Lombard League victory in the Battle of Legnano in 1176 and its coat of arms depicts the Monument to the Warrior of Legnano in the centre of Legnano.

History

World War II 

The Legnano was activated as an infantry division on 8 February 1934. Initially the division consisted of the 7th Infantry Regiment "Cuneo", 8th Infantry Regiment "Cuneo", 67th Infantry Regiment "Palermo" and 27th Artillery Regiment. On 24 March 1939 the division was split into the 6th Infantry Division "Cuneo" and 58th Infantry Division "Legnano". After the split the "Legnano" fielded the 67th Infantry Regiment "Palermo", 68th Infantry Regiment "Palermo" and 58th Artillery Regiment.

In 1940 the division remained in Fenestrelle as a reserve force during the Italian invasion of southern France. After the Italian invasion of Greece in October 1940 bogged down under stiff Greek resistance the "Legnano" division was dispatched to Albania in January 1941 to augment the Italian forces under pressure by the Greek counteroffensive.

In November 1942 the division participated in the occupation of Vichy France and remained afterwards in France on occupation duty. In August 1943 the division returned to Italy - first to Bologna and then to Brindisi in the South of Italy. After Allied forces had landed on the Italian peninsula and an armistice between Italy and the Allies had been signed, the division stayed loyal to the Italian King Victor Emmanuel III, who fled with the royal court from Rome to Brindisi.

I Motorized Grouping 
Already on 26 September 1943 parts of the division were used to form the I Motorized Grouping, which was to aid in the allied war effort. The I Motorized Grouping consisted of the following units:

 I Motorized Grouping (formed with officers and troops of the 58th Infantry Division "Legnano" Command Group)
 67th Infantry Regiment "Palermo"
 Command Company
 I Battalion/67th Infantry Regiment
 I Battalion/93rd Infantry Regiment (from the 18th Infantry Division "Messina")
 LI Bersaglieri Officer Cadets Training Battalion
 281st Anti-tank Company (S-18/1000 anti-tank rifles)
 V Anti-tank Battalion (newly formed)
 1st Tank Company (L6/40 light tanks)
 16th Anti-tank Cannons Company (47/32 mod. 1935 anti-tank cannons)
 56th Anti-tank Cannons Company (47/32 mod. 1935 anti-tank cannons)
 11th Motorized Artillery Regiment (from the 104th Motorized Division "Mantova")
 Command Unit
 III Field Howitzers Group (75/18 mod. 1935) howitzers)
 IV Field Howitzers Group (75/18 Mod. 1935 howitzers)
 XII Heavy Cannons Group (105/28 canons)
 CCCXIV Field Howitzers Group (Skoda houfnice vz 14|100/22]] howitzers)
 1st Anti-aircraft Cannons Battery (20/65 guns)
 Ammunition and Supplies Unit
 Mixed Engineer Company
 1st Telegraphers Engineer Platoon
 1st Radiotelegraphers Engineer Platoon
 1st Signal Engineer Platoon
 Services (logistic, medical, transport, etc. units)

In the next months the division lost all its units, which were needed on the front lines. On 17 February 1944 the division was deactivated after its last units had joined other units.

Combat Group "Legnano 
On 24 September 1944 the II Brigade of the Italian Liberation Corps ("Corpo Italiano di Liberazione", or CIL), was renamed as Combat Group "Legnano". The Combat Group consisted of the 68th Infantry Regiment "Palermo", the 11th Artillery Regiment, the elite IX Assault Unit and the Special Infantry Regiment "Legnano", which consisted of the remnants of the 3rd Alpini Regiment and 4th Bersaglieri Regiment. The Combat Group was equipped with British weapons and materiel. The combat group's structure when it entered the front was:

 Combat Group "Legnano"
 68th Infantry Regiment "Palermo"
 Command Company
 I Infantry Battalion
 II Infantry Battalion
 III Battalion "Col Moschin" (former independent IX Assault Unit)
 Mortar Company (ML 3-inch mortars)
 Anti-tank Cannons Company (57/50 (6-pdr) anti-tank guns)
 Special Infantry Regiment "Legnano"
 Command Company
 Bersaglieri Battalion "Goito"
 Alpini Battalion "Piemonte"
 Alpini Battalion "Abruzzi" (renamed Alpini Battalion "L'Aquila" on 25 November 1944)
 Mortar Company (ML 3-inch mortars)
 Anti-tank Cannons Company (57/50 (17-pdr) anti-tank guns)
 11th Artillery Regiment "Mantova"
 Command Unit
 I Field Howitzers Group (88/27 (25-pdr) howitzers)
 II Field Howitzers Group (88/27 (25-pdr) howitzers)
 III Field Howitzers Group (88/27 (25-pdr) howitzers)
 IV Field Howitzers Group (88/27 (25-pdr) howitzers)
 V Anti-tank Cannons Group (76/55 (17-pdr) anti-tank guns)
 VI Anti-aircraft Group (40/56 anti-aircraft guns)
 LI Mixed Engineer Battalion
 1st Construction Engineer Company
 2nd Construction Engineer Company
 Signal Engineer Company
 Divisional Services (logistic, medical, transport, etc. units)

The Legnano entered the front as part of the Polish II Corps on the extreme left of the British 8th Army near the river Idice and was tasked with liberating Bologna.

Cold War 
After the war the combat group was garrisoned in Bergamo. When the 67th Infantry Regiment "Palermo" returned to the combat group on 15 October 1946 the group became once more the Infantry Division "Legnano". The division also received the 3rd Cavalry Reconnaissance Group. In 1947 the two infantry regiments changed their name from "Palermo" to "Legnano" and the division was augmented with the Horse Artillery Regiment "Volòire".

In the next years the division was motorized with American equipment and the 3rd Cavalry Reconnaissance Group was increased to full regiment with three battalions of armoured and mechanized cavalry. The division was the only major unit of the III Territorial Military Command in Milan until the command became the III Army Corps on 1 July 1957. Subsequently, the Armored Division Centauro in Novara, the Infantry Division "Cremona" and Alpine Brigade "Taurinense" both based in Turin entered the III Army Corps.

On 1 May 1958 the 4th Armored Infantry Regiment joined the division. The regiment consisted of the XX Tank Battalion with M47 Patton tanks and the II Bersaglieri Battalion. At the same time the 3rd Cavalry Regiment was reduced to Divisional Reconnaissance Group "Legnano". After the four artillery groups of the 11th Artillery Regiment had been re-equipped with M101 105mm and M114 155mm howitzers, the Horse Artillery Regiment "Volòire" was transferred to the III Army Corps.

The structure of the division before the 1975 reform was as follows:

  Infantry Division "Legnano", in Bergamo
  4th Armored Infantry Regiment, in Legnano
 Command and Services Company, in Legnano (includes an anti-tank guided missile platoon)
 II Bersaglieri Battalion, in Legnano (M113 armored personnel carriers)
 XX Tank Battalion, in Legnano (M47 Patton tanks)
  67th Infantry Regiment "Legnano", in Montorio Veronese
 Command and Services Company, in Montorio Veronese
 I Infantry Battalion, in Montorio Veronese
 II Infantry Battalion, in Montorio Veronese
 III Infantry Battalion, in Montorio Veronese
 IV Mechanized Battalion, in Montorio Veronese (M113 armored personnel carriers and M47 tanks)
 Regimental Anti-tank Company, in Montorio Veronese (anti-tank guided missiles and M47 tanks)
  68th Infantry Regiment "Legnano", in Bergamo
 Command and Services Company, in Bergamo
 I Infantry Battalion, in Bergamo
 II Infantry Battalion, in Como
 III Infantry Battalion, in Brescia
 IV Mechanized Battalion, in Monza (M113 armored personnel carriers and M47 tanks)
 Regimental Anti-tank Company, in Monza (anti-tank guided missiles and M47 tanks)
  11th Field Artillery Regiment, in Cremona
 Command and Services Battery, in Cremona
 I Field Artillery Group, in Cremona (M14/61 105mm towed howitzers)
 II Field Artillery Group, in Cremona (M14/61 105mm towed howitzers)
 III Self-propelled Field Artillery Group, in Vercelli (M7 105mm self-propelled howitzers)
 IV Heavy Field Artillery Group, in Cremona (M114 155mm towed howitzers)
 V Light Anti-aircraft Artillery Group (Reserve), in (?) (Bofors 40mm anti-aircraft guns and 12.7mm anti-aircraft machine guns)
 Artillery Specialists Battery, in Cremona
 "Lancieri di Milano" Squadrons Group, in Monza (Fiat Campagnola reconnaissance vehicles and M47 Patton tanks)
 Engineer Battalion "Legnano", in Verona
 Signal Battalion "Legnano", in Bergamo
 Services Grouping "Legnano", in Presezzo
 Command Platoon, in Presezzo
 Supply, Repairs, Recovery Unit "Legnano", in Orio al Serio
 Transport Unit "Legnano", in Presezzo
 Medical Battalion "Legnano" (Reserve), in Presezzo (includes the 5th Field Hospital)
 Provisions Supply Company "Legnano", in Presezzo

 The Light Aviation Unit "Legnano", at Bergamo-Orio al Serio Air Base was disbanded on 16 July 1972.

In 1975 the Italian Army undertook a major reorganization of it forces: the regimental level was abolished and battalions came under direct command of multi-arms brigades. Therefore, on 29 October 1975 the Infantry Division "Legnano" was split to form the Mechanized Brigade "Legnano" in Bergamo and the Mechanized Brigade "Brescia" in Brescia. The I and IV battalions of the 68th Infantry Regiment "Legnano" and the battalions of the 4th Armored Infantry Regiment were used to form the "Legnano" brigade. The I and III battalion of the 67th Infantry Regiment along with the III Battalion of the 68th Infantry Regiment were used to form the Mechanized Brigade "Brescia".

The 11th Field Artillery Regiment and its I and II groups were disbanded, while the III group was transferred to the 3rd Mechanized Brigade "Goito". The IV Heavy Field Artillery Group became the 11th Field Artillery Group "Monferrato" and remained with the "Legnano" brigade. The VII Reconnaissance Squadrons Group "Lancieri di Milano" was transferred to the Mechanized Division "Mantova", while the division's Signal Battalion, Engineer Battalion and Services Grouping were split among the two new brigades. After the reform the Legnano's authorized strength was 4,733 men (272 Officers, 637 non-commissioned officers and 3,824 soldiers) and it joined the Armored Division "Centauro". After the reform the brigade consisted of the following units:

  Mechanized Brigade "Legnano", in Bergamo
 Command and Signal Unit "Legnano", in Bergamo
  2nd Bersaglieri Battalion "Governolo", in Legnano
  67th Mechanized Infantry Battalion "Montelungo", in Monza
  68th Mechanized Infantry Battalion "Palermo", in Bergamo
  20th Tank Battalion "M.O. Pentimalli", in Legnano (Leopard 1A2 main battle tanks)
  11th Field Artillery Group "Monferrato", in Cremona (M114 155mm towed howitzers)
  Logistic Battalion "Legnano", in Presezzo
 Anti-tank Company "Legnano", in Monza (BGM-71 TOW anti-tank guided missiles)
 Engineer Company "Legnano", Bergamo

In 1982 and 1983 the brigade provided personnel for the Italian contingent of the Multinational Force in Lebanon. In 1986 the Italian Army abolished the divisional level and the Legnano came under direct command of the 3rd Army Corps. On 30 November 1989 the 68th Mechanized Infantry Battalion "Palermo" was disbanded.

After the end of the Cold War the Italian Army began to draw down its forces and therefore starting in 1991 the Legnano received and lost units repeatedly over the coming years: In June 1991 the brigade received the 4th Tank Battalion "M.O. Passalacqua" and 18th Bersaglieri Battalion "Poggio Scanno" from the disbanded Mechanized Brigade "Goito". The same year the Legnano received the 52nd Field Artillery Group from the disbanded Mechanized Brigade "Brescia", while the 11th Field Artillery Group "Monferrato" was disbanded on 27 August 1991. On 27 August 1992 the 4th Tank Battalion "M.O. Passalacqua" merged with the 67th Mechanized Infantry Battalion "Montelungo" to form the 67th Armored Infantry Regiment "Legnano". In 1993 the brigade provided troops for the United Nations Operation in Somalia II. At the same time the remaining battalions of the brigade returned to use their name regimental names for traditional reasons without changing their composition or size.

In 1995 the Army began a further round of cuts which included the Legnano and so on 5 October 1995 the 67th Armored Infantry Regiment "Legnano" was disbanded. The same year the brigade transferred the 4th Tank Regiment and 52nd Self-propelled Field Artillery Regiment to the Armored Brigade "Centauro", followed in 1996 by the 2nd Bersaglieri and 3rd Bersaglieri regiments.

On 16 September 1996 the brigade became the Support Units Command "Legnano" with the following units of the 3rd Army Corps:

  Support Units Command "Legnano", in Bergamo
 Command and Services Unit "Legnano", in Bergamo
  Regiment "Nizza Cavalleria" (1st), in Pinerolo (transferred to the Armored Brigade "Centauro" on 15 October 1997)
  26th Infantry (Recruits Training) Regiment "Bergamo", in Diano Castello
  Lagunari Regiment "Serenissima", in Venezia-Lido
  Horse Artillery Regiment "Voloire", in Milan
  10th Engineer Regiment, in Cremona
  1st Signal Regiment, in Milan
  33rd Logistic Regiment "Ambrosiano", in Solbiate Olona
 3rd Army Aviation Regiment "Aldebaran", in Bresso (disbanded 1 September 1998)

But already on 31 December 1997 the Support Units Command "Legnano" was disbanded and its units came under direct command of the 3rd Army Corps.

External links 
Italian Army Homepage: "Legnano" History

References

Mechanized brigades of Italy